Schoof's algorithm is an efficient algorithm to count points on elliptic curves over finite fields. The algorithm has applications in elliptic curve cryptography where it is important to know the number of points to judge the difficulty of solving the discrete logarithm problem in the group of points on an elliptic curve.

The algorithm was published by René Schoof in 1985 and it was a theoretical breakthrough, as it was the first deterministic polynomial time algorithm for counting points on elliptic curves. Before Schoof's algorithm, approaches to counting points on elliptic curves such as the naive and baby-step giant-step algorithms were, for the most part, tedious and had an exponential running time.
 
This article explains Schoof's approach, laying emphasis on the mathematical ideas underlying the structure of the algorithm.

Introduction
Let  be an elliptic curve defined over the finite field , where  for  a prime and  an integer . Over a field of characteristic  an elliptic curve can be given by a (short) Weierstrass equation
 
The set of points defined over  consists of the solutions  satisfying the curve equation and a point at infinity . Using the group law on elliptic curves restricted to this set one can see that this set  forms an abelian group, with  acting as the zero element.
Schoof's approach to computing the cardinality  makes use of Hasse's theorem on elliptic curves along with the Chinese remainder theorem and division polynomials.

Hasse's theorem

Hasse's theorem states that if  is an elliptic curve over the finite field , then  satisfies

 

This powerful result, given by Hasse in 1934, simplifies our problem by narrowing down  to a finite (albeit large) set of possibilities. Defining  to be , and making use of this result, we now have that computing the value of  modulo  where , is sufficient for determining , and thus . While there is no efficient way to compute  directly for general , it is possible to compute  for  a small prime, rather efficiently. We choose  to be a set of distinct primes such that . Given  for all , the Chinese remainder theorem allows us to compute .

In order to compute  for a prime , we make use of the theory of the Frobenius endomorphism  and division polynomials. Note that considering primes  is no loss since we can always pick a bigger prime to take its place to ensure the product is big enough. In any case Schoof's algorithm is most frequently used in addressing the case  since there are more efficient, so called  adic algorithms for small-characteristic fields.

The Frobenius endomorphism

  
Theorem: The Frobenius endomorphism given by  satisfies the characteristic equation

  where 

However, the degrees get very large and this approach is impractical.

Schoof's idea was to carry out this computation restricted to points of order  for various small primes .
Note that  and that for any integer  we have . Hence we have reduced our problem to solving the equation

 

Computation modulo primes
The th division polynomial is such that its roots are precisely the  coordinates of points of order .

The scalar multiplication  can be done either by double-and-add methods or by using the th division polynomial. The latter approach gives:

 

where  is the th division polynomial. Note that   

Note that these equalities are checked modulo .

Case 1: 
By using the addition formula for the group  we obtain:

 
Note that this computation fails in case the assumption of inequality was wrong.

Using the -coordinate one later determines which of the two cases holds.

We first show that  is a function in  alone. Consider .

 

and have that

 
 
Here, it seems not right, we throw away ?

Now if  for one  then  satisfies

 

for all -torsion points .

Case 2: 
We begin with the assumption that . Since  is an odd prime it cannot be that  and thus . The characteristic equation yields that . And consequently that .  
This implies that  is a square modulo . Let . If so,  is  depending on the y-coordinate.  
 
The characteristic equation gives .

Additional case 
Since we assume  to be odd,  and in particular,  if and only if  has an element of order 2. By definition of addition in the group, any element of order 2 must be of the form .

The algorithm
     Input:
         1. An elliptic curve .
         2.
     Output:
     Choose a set of odd primes  not containing  
     
     . 
     All computations in the loop below are performed 
     
          
            
         
             
             
                 
                     
                         
                     else
                         
         else if  is a square modulo  then
             
             
             
                 
             
                 
             else
                 
         else
             
     Use the Chinese Remainder Theorem to compute  modulo 
         from the equations , where .
     Output .

Complexity
This involves exponentiation in the ring  and requires  multiplications. Given that this computation needs to be carried out for each of the  primes, the total complexity of Schoof's algorithm turns out to be .

Improvements to Schoof's algorithm

In the 1990s, Noam Elkies, followed by A. O. L. Atkin, devised improvements to Schoof's basic algorithm by restricting the set of primes  considered before to primes of a certain kind. These came to be called Elkies primes and Atkin primes respectively. Atkin showed how to combine information obtained from the Atkin primes with the information obtained from Elkies primes to produce an efficient algorithm, which came to be known as the Schoof–Elkies–Atkin algorithm. The first problem to address is to determine whether a given prime is Elkies or Atkin. In order to do so, we make use of modular polynomials, which come from the study of modular forms and an interpretation of elliptic curves over the complex numbers as lattices. For efficient implementation, probabilistic root-finding algorithms are used, which makes this a Las Vegas algorithm rather than a deterministic algorithm.
Under the heuristic assumption that approximately half of the primes up to an  bound are Elkies primes, this yields an algorithm that is more efficient than Schoof's, with an expected running time of  using naive arithmetic, and  using fast arithmetic.  Although this heuristic assumption is known to hold for most elliptic curves, it is not known to hold in every case, even under the GRH.

Implementations
Several algorithms were implemented in C++ by Mike Scott and are available with source code. The implementations are free (no terms, no conditions), and make use of the MIRACL library which is distributed under the AGPLv3.

See also
 Elliptic curve cryptography
 Counting points on elliptic curves
 Division Polynomials
 Frobenius endomorphism

References
 R. Schoof: Elliptic Curves over Finite Fields and the Computation of Square Roots mod p. Math. Comp., 44(170):483–494, 1985. Available at http://www.mat.uniroma2.it/~schoof/ctpts.pdf
 R. Schoof: Counting Points on Elliptic Curves over Finite Fields. J. Theor. Nombres Bordeaux 7:219–254, 1995. Available at http://www.mat.uniroma2.it/~schoof/ctg.pdf
Available at http://www.math.umn.edu/~musiker/schoof.pdf
 V. Müller : Die Berechnung der Punktanzahl von elliptischen kurven über endlichen Primkörpern. Master's Thesis. Universität  des Saarlandes, Saarbrücken, 1991. Available at http://lecturer.ukdw.ac.id/vmueller/publications.php
 A. Enge: Elliptic Curves and their Applications to Cryptography: An Introduction. Kluwer Academic Publishers, Dordrecht, 1999. 
 L. C. Washington: Elliptic Curves: Number Theory and Cryptography. Chapman & Hall/CRC, New York, 2003.
 N. Koblitz: A Course in Number Theory and Cryptography, Graduate Texts in Math. No. 114, Springer-Verlag, 1987. Second edition, 1994

Asymmetric-key algorithms
Elliptic curve cryptography
Elliptic curves
Group theory
Finite fields
Number theory